The 18th ESPY Awards were held on July 14, 2010, at the Nokia Theatre, hosted by Seth Meyers. For the first time since 2003 (when the ceremony was aired on a delay several days later), ESPN televised the ceremony live.

Categories 
There are 37 categories and 3 special awards. The winners are listed first in bold. Other nominees are in alphabetical order.

In Memoriam

Nodar Kumaritashvili
Jose Lima
Bob Probert
Yeardley Love
Chris Henry
Gaines Adams
Jasper Howard
Abe Pollin
Raymond Parks
Juan Antonio Samaranch
Myles Brand
Chet Simmons
Don Coryell
Merlin Olsen
Dottie Kamenshek
Robin Roberts
George Michael
Manute Bol
Ernie Harwell
Bob Sheppard
George Steinbrenner
John Wooden

References

2010
ESPY
ESPY
ESPY
ESPY